The 1973–74 NBA season was the Warriors' 28th season in the NBA and 12th in the San Francisco Bay Area.

Offseason

Draft picks

Roster

Regular season

Season standings

z – clinched division title
y – clinched division title
x – clinched playoff spot

Record vs. opponents

Game log

Awards and records
 Nate Thurmond, NBA All-Star Game
 Rick Barry, NBA All-Star Game
 Rick Barry, All-NBA First Team
 Nate Thurmond, NBA All-Defensive Second Team

References

Golden State
Golden State Warriors seasons
Golden
Golden